Out Here may refer to:

Out Here (Love album), 1969
Out Here (Christian McBride album), 2013
"Out Here", a 2005 song by Pendulum from Hold Your Colour
"Out Here", a 2019 song by British girl group 303

See also

Out of Here (disambiguation)
 Out There (disambiguation)